The CAVB qualification for the 2014 FIVB Volleyball Women's World Championship saw member nations compete for two places at the finals in Italy.

Draw
42 CAVB national teams entered qualification (10 teams later withdrew). The teams were distributed according to their geographical positions.

Sub zonal round

 Pool I later merged with Pool H after Rwanda and Sudan pulled out of the competition. Egypt and Ethiopia, which were the other two teams in Pool I, joined other teams in Pool H.

Final round

The draw for the final round of competition was held in Cairo on 9 October 2013. The top two FIVB ranked teams Algeria and Kenya headed the pools.

Sub zonal round

Pool A
Venue:  Salle Ammar Dakhlaoui, Sidi Bou Said, Tunisia
Dates: July 18–19, 2013
All times are Central European Time (UTC+01:00)

|}

|}

Pool B
Venue:  Marius Ndiaye Stadium, Dakar, Senegal
Dates: July 18–21, 2013
All times are Greenwich Mean Time (UTC±00:00)

|}

|}

Pool D
Venue:  Palais des Sports de Ouaga 2000, Ouagadougou, Burkina Faso
Dates: July 17–19, 2013
All times are Greenwich Mean Time (UTC±00:00)

|}

|}

Pool E
Venue:  Indoor Sports Hall, Abuja, Nigeria
Dates: July 23–25, 2013
All times are West Africa Time (UTC+01:00)

|}

|}

Pool F
Venue:  Gymnase du Prytanée Militaire, Libreville, Gabon
Dates: July 19–21, 2013

|}

|}

Pool H
Venue:  Kasarani Hall, Nairobi, Kenya
Dates: July 26–30, 2013
All times are East Africa Time (UTC+03:00)

|}

|}

Pool J
Venue:  Pavilhão da Munhuana, Maputo, Mozambique
Dates: July 3–6, 2013
All times are Central Africa Time (UTC+02:00)

|}

|}

Pool K
Venue:  African Bible College, Lilongwe, Malawi
Dates: July 23–25, 2013
All times are Central Africa Time (UTC+02:00)

|}

|}

Pool L
Venue:  Palais des Sports, Victoria, Seychelles
Dates: July 26–28, 2013
All times are Seychelles Time (UTC+04:00)

|}

|}

Zonal round

Pool N
Venue:  Pavilhão Desportivo Vavá Duarte, Praia, Cape Verde
Dates: November 8–10, 2013
All times are Cape Verde Time (UTC−01:00)

|}

  qualified from the sub zonal round but withdrew.

|}

Pool O
Venue:  Forum de l'Université de Cocody, Abidjan, Ivory Coast
Dates: November 28–30, 2013
All times are Greenwich Mean Time (UTC±00:00)

|}

|}

Pool P
Venue:  Stadium des Martyrs, Kinshasa, DR Congo
Dates: November 3–4, 2013
All times are West Africa Time (UTC+01:00)

|}

|}

Pool Q
Venue:  MTN Arena, Kampala, Uganda
Dates: October 17–19, 2013
All times are East Africa Time (UTC+03:00)

|}

|}

Pool R
Venue:  National Sports Development Centre, Lusaka, Zambia
Dates: October 22–26, 2013
All times are Central Africa Time (UTC+02:00)

|}

|}

Pool S
Venue:  Gymnase Pandit-Sahadeo, Vacoas-Phoenix, Mauritius
Dates: October 6, 2013
All times are Mauritius Time (UTC+04:00)

|}

|}

Final round

Pool T
Venue:  Salle Hacène Harcha, Algiers, Algeria
Dates: February 23 – March 1, 2014
All times are Central European Time (UTC+01:00)

|}

  qualified from the zonal round but withdrew.

|}

Pool U
Venue:  Safaricom Indoor Arena, Nairobi, Kenya
Dates: February 16–22, 2014
All times are East Africa Time (UTC+03:00)

|}

  qualified from the zonal round but withdrew.

|}

References

External links 
 Official website

2014 FIVB Volleyball Women's World Championship
2013 in women's volleyball
2014 in women's volleyball
FIVB Volleyball World Championship qualification